The U.S. Post Office is a post office building in Roseburg, Oregon, in the United States. It was constructed in 1916 and was added to the National Register of Historic Places on June 18, 1979.

See also
 National Register of Historic Places listings in Douglas County, Oregon

References

1916 establishments in Oregon
Beaux-Arts architecture in Oregon
Buildings and structures completed in 1916
Buildings and structures in Roseburg, Oregon
Georgian Revival architecture in Oregon
National Register of Historic Places in Douglas County, Oregon
Post office buildings on the National Register of Historic Places in Oregon